Khlong Chak Phra is a khlong (canal) in Bangkok's Thonburi area. It separates from Khlong Bangkok Noi at front of Wat Suwan Keree and terminates at the confluence of khlongs Mon and Bangkok Yai. It serves as a demarcation line between Bangkok Noi and Taling Chan Districts all the length. It is about 10-15 m (36-49 ft) wide and 5.45 km (about 3 mi) long. Khlong Chak Phra is a natural khlong, which was the result of dissection of the Chao Phraya River's original route through Bangkok during the medieval Ayutthaya like Khlong Bangkok Yai and Khlong Bangkok Noi.

Its name means 'pulling the Buddha canal'. It is a venue that is used for the annual tradition called Chak Phra, in which the Buddha's relics and Buddha statues are invited from Wat Nang Chi in Phasi Charoen District onto a flowered barge. The barge procession then sails from Khlong Dan, turning left into Khlong Bangkok Yai, entering Khlong Bangkok Noi, passing Wat Kai Tia at Khlong Chak Phra before ending at the Taling Chan District Office. The tradition is held annually on the second day of the waning moon of the twelfth Thai lunar month, and is regarded as the only Chak Phra observed in Bangkok.

Its other names were Khlong Bang Khun Si (คลองบางขุนศรี) and Maenam Bang Khun Si (แม่น้ำบางขุนศรี). 

Along the khlong is Taling Chan floating market, the floating market next to Taling Chan District Office and the Southern railway line. It is the largest market in this area. In addition, its name has become two administrative districts of Bangkok include Taling Chan District's Khlong Chak Phra Subdistrict and Bangkok Noi District's Bang Khun Si Subdistrict.

References

Canals in Thailand
Taling Chan district
Bangkok Noi district
Tourist attractions in Bangkok
Chao Phraya River